Feroze Wattwan فیروز وٹواں is a town in Sheikhupura District, Punjab, Pakistan.

Populated places in Sheikhupura District